Bulgarians are an ethnic minority in North Macedonia. Bulgarians are mostly found in the Strumica area, but over the years, the absolute majority of southeastern North Macedonia have declared themselves Macedonian. The town of Strumica and its surrounding area (including Novo Selo) were part of the Kingdom of Bulgaria between the Balkan wars and the end of World War I, as well as during World War II. The total number of Bulgarians counted in the 2021 Census was 3,504 or roughly 0.2%. Around 97,000 nationals of North Macedonia have received Bulgarian citizenship since 2001, and some 53,000 are still waiting for such. In the period when North Macedonia was part of Yugoslavia, there was also migration of Bulgarians from the so called Western Outlands in Serbia.

History

Middle Ages and Ottoman Rule
Throughout the Middle Ages and up until the early 20th century the Slavic speaking majority in the Region of Macedonia was more commonly referred to (both, by themselves and outsiders) as Bulgarians.

Yugoslavia

Until the Balkan wars the majority of the Slav population of all three parts of the wider region of Macedonia had Bulgarian identity. In 1913, the region of present-day Republic of North Macedonia became a part of the Kingdom of Serbia, thus becoming Southern Serbia. During World War I and World War II, when most regions of Macedonia were annexed by Bulgaria, a pro-Bulgarian sentiment still existed among the Slavic majority. However, harsh treatment by occupying Bulgarian troops reduced significantly the pro-Bulgarian orientation of the Macedonian Slavs. After the end of World War II, the creation of People's Republic of Macedonia and the codification of a new Macedonian language, a process of ethnogenesis started and a distinct national Macedonian identity was inaugurated into an established system. The new Yugoslav authorities began a policy of removing of any Bulgarian influence, making North Macedonia a connecting link for the establishment of new Balkan Communist Federation and creating a distinct Slavic consciousness that would inspire identification with Yugoslavia. The authorities took also repressive measures that would overcome the Bulgarian national identity of the population, such as the Bloody Christmas in 1945. In North Macedonia the Bulgarophobia increased almost to the level of state ideology, and the communists were successful in removing all Bulgarian influence in the region. A special Law for the Protection of Macedonian National Honour was passed by the government of the SR Macedonia at the end of 1944. The Presidium of Anti-fascist Assembly for the National Liberation of Macedonia established a special court for the implementation of this law, which came into effect on January 3, 1945. Bulgarian sources claim that in early 1945, around 100,000 Bulgarophiles were imprisoned and over 1,260 were allegedly killed due to this Law.  In the period between 1945 and 1991, when North Macedonia was part of Yugoslavia, there was also migration of Bulgarian population from SR Serbia to the SR Macedonia. The number of these migrants is unofficially estimated at 20,000.

The Fall of Communism to Present-Day

By the time the then-Republic of Macedonia proclaimed its independence those who continued to look to Bulgaria were very few. Some 3,000 - 4,000 people that stuck to their Bulgarian identity (most from Strumica and surroundings) met great hostility among the authorities and the rest of the population. With the fall of Communism the hostility decreased, but still remains. Occasional trials against Bulgarophiles have continued until today. In the period after 1991 ca. 100,000 citizens of North Macedonia have acquired Bulgarian citizenship (which represents 10% of the self-declared ethnic Macedonians in the country in the 2021 population census), almost all of them acquired by descent and always on 1st position by acquired citizenship per country. On 11 December 2020 at the Parliament, the Minister of Justice of Bulgaria Desislava Ahladova reported that from 1 January 2010 to 22 October 2020, 77,829 files have been opened for the acquisition of Bulgarian citizenship by citizens of North Macedonia, 77,762 of them based on declared Bulgarian origin. Macedonian citizens are starting to take out Bulgarian passports due to the fact that Bulgaria is becoming a member of the European Union, and with that, the only prospect for Macedonian citizens is to be able to work and live in European countries where there are greater conditions for prosperity.

There were 37 ethnic Bulgarians born in North Macedonia who lived in the United States of America in 2015.

In 2021, Bulgarian President Rumen Radev claimed that some 120,000 Macedonian citizens held Bulgarian passports and insisted on putting them into North Macedonia's constitution, which lists the Albanian, Serbian, Bosniak, Turkish, Romani peoples, as well as the other peoples inhabiting the country.

Politics
Bulgarians in North Macedonia do not have their own political parties, but still have political activity. Many politicians have revealed their affiliation to Bulgaria after leaving the political stage, such as Ljubčo Georgievski.

Radko Association 
Association Radko is an illegal Bulgarian political organisation in North Macedonia. The "Radko" association was registered in Ohrid in 2000. In 2001 the Constitutional Court of North Macedonia banned the organization Radko as "promoting racial and religious hate and intolerance". The association is named after the conspiration pseudonym of Ivan Mihailov, leader of Internal Macedonian Revolutionary Organization during the interbellum. In official Macedonian historiography, Mihailov is a terrorist and a Bulgarian chauvinist. In 2009 the European Court of Human Rights in Strasbourg, condemned North Macedonia because of violations of the European Convention of Human Rights in this case.

Bulgarian Clubs 

In the autumn of 2022, the parliament of North Macedonia adopted changes to the Law on Associations and Foundations in which clubs and organizations cannot be registered if their names reference fascism and national socialism or if they incite religious, national or racial hatred or intolerance. This change came after the opening of two Bulgarian clubs - one named after Ivan Mihailov and the other named after Tsar Boris III. There was also an attempt to register a third club, named after Tsar Ferdinand I. After the opening of the two clubs, protests were organized and the clubs were attacked. The Commission for Protection against Discrimination concluded that the club names discriminate against the Macedonian public on a national and ethnic grounds. The Commission was referred by the Association of Fighters the National Liberation War and the anti-fascist war.  According to the Bulgarian co-chairman of the common Bulgarian-Macedonian historical commission Angel Dimitrov, the arguments for these changes remind him of the Law for the Protection of Macedonian National Honour. Per Dimitrov, this shows that the Macedonians still use propaganda from the early times of Communist Yugoslavia.

Ethnically Motivated Attacks and Hate Crimes and Repercussions 

On 5 June 2022, the entrance of the Bulgarian Cultural Centre "Vancho Mihaylov" in Bitola was set on fire. The attacker, Lambe Alabakovski was swiftly apprehended and was given a 6 months suspended sentence. However, on Macedonian social media, the attacker was celebrated as a hero. The opening of the second Bulgarian cultural centre, the "Boris III" cultural club in Ohrid, was accompanied by protests involving anti-Bulgarian slogans, shouting of anti-Bulgarian slur such as "Tatars", "Fascists", throwing eggs, etc. Five days later, on 12 October 2022, the sign above the front door of the club was smashed. On 20 November 2022, the glass façade of the same club was smashed by three masked men throwing stones, an incident that was followed by gun fire opened at the club from a car on 22 November. On 30 January 2022, the car of the Chairman of the Association of Macedonian-Bulgarian Friendship in Skopje was vandalised.

In response, on 13 December 2022, Bulgaria presented the EU General Affairs Council with a petition requesting that the effective prosecution of hate crimes against ethnic Bulgarians in North Macedonia be made a precondition of North Macedonia's accession negotiations with the European Union.

On 20 January 2023, the secretary of the Bulgarian club in Ohrid, Hristijan Pendikov, was assaulted, with resulting brain injury, broken jaw and broken teeth; Pendikov was subsequently airlifted to Sofia for medical treatment. The incident was condemned by Bulgarian president Rumen Radev and acting Bulgarian Foreign minister Nikolay Milkov, who warned that the assault could further complicate North Macedonia's accession talks with the EU; they both linked the country's European integration with achieving progress in the eradication of hate speech against Bulgaria and Bulgarians and the observance of the rights of Macedonian Bulgarians. Milkov also stated that Pendikov continues to receive threats online. On 23 January 2023, The Bulgarian ambassador in North Macedonia was recalled to Sofia for consultations, with the Ministry quoting "the grave situation regarding the rights of Bulgarians in North Macedonia and the escalation of acts and hate crimes against them in recent months" as the reason.
 
Оn 27 January 2023, the Sofia District Prosecutor's Office launched an investigation into the ongoing murder threats received by Pendikov.

On 30 January 2023, three suspects were apprehended, one of them with Bulgarian citizenship. On 8 February 2023, the Ohrid District's Attorney charged the detainees with an "ethnically-motivated hate crime". The President of North Macedonia Stevo Pendarovski condemned the incident and stated that certain political subjects in Bulgaria have used this case for their political goals.

On 26 February 2023, in response to an interview of Pendikov before major nationwide Bulgarian TV channel bTV, where Pendikov asserted that the rights of Macedonian Bulgarians were consistently being violated, North Macedonian Deputy Prime Minister Bojan Maricik called on the North Macedonian Public Prosecutor's Office to launch an invesitigation into Pendkov for "offending" the Macedonian people.

Historical connection with World War II 

As a reason for the hate crimes, North Macedonian authorities have referred to their names, as Tsar Boris III and Vancho Mihailov are regarded as fascist collaborators and the Bulgarian occupation during World War II is considered one of the darkest periods in the history of the country. However, their Bulgarian opponents have argued that these claims do not correspond to historical facts and that the very existence of fascism in Bulgaria is highly contentious, as it is thought to have been fabricated to serve Bulgarian communist historiography. 

For example, in contrast with the dogmas of Macedonian historiography, the Bulgarian Army is recorded to have largely been greeted as liberators by the Macedonian population in April 1941.  The Regional Committee of Communists in Macedonia headed by Metodi Shatorov refused the Communist Party of Yugoslavia's orders to denounce the Bulgarians as occupiers or start armed struggle, instead calling for the incorporation of the local Macedonian Communist organizations into the Bulgarian Communist Party 

Moreover, the relative war losses of ethnic Macedonians during World War II (6,724) were by far the lowest among any other ethnic group in former Yugoslavia and even among them, more than half lost their lives on the Syrmian Front in 1945, well after the end of the occupation. In addition, up to one half of the army stationed in Vardar Macedonia (approx. 30,000) from 1941 to 1944 and most of the police consisted of local conscripts. Thus, the greatest "Bulgarian" atrocity perpetrated in the region, the massacre of 12 young civilians at the village of Vataša was actually perpetrated by an officer born in Kriva Palanka, while the only victim of the attack on 11 October 1941, celebrated as the Day of the Macedonian Uprising against fascism, was from the North Macedonian village of Smilevo and was kin of revolutionary Dame Gruev, who is otherwise revered in the country.

There are currenty minority revisionist opinions in North Macedonia that question the official historical narrative inherited from the communist era. For example, former North Macedonian Prime Minister Zoran Zaev has stated that Bulgarians were not fascist occupiers and that many other historical facts that have been altered and concealed for decades in North Macedonia. According to the Macedonian researcher Katerina Kolozova, this terminology today is groundless, because significant part of these "occupiers" were practically local collaborators of the Bulgarian authorities. She maintains the descendants of the Yugoslav communist partisans in her country who form the post-Yugoslav elite are the main factor that ignites these anti-Bulgarian sentiments there. According to the former Macedonian Prime Minister Lyubcho Georgievski, the "Bulgarian occupiers" were welcomed as liberators from Serbian occupation, which was much longer and more difficult than the Bulgarian one, but in regard to which, the Macedonian society has fallen into a long historical amnesia.

See also
 Ethnic Macedonians in Bulgaria
 Macedonian Question
 Macedonian Bulgarians
 Bulgaria–North Macedonia relations
 Bulgarian Cultural Club – Skopje

References 

Macedonian Bulgarians
Macedonia
Ethnic groups in North Macedonia
Bulgaria–North Macedonia relations
Macedonia